"Cesarium/Black Lung Optimism" is a 2007 double A-sided single from Scottish post-hardcore band The Ocean Fracture. The two tracks on this release were originally to be presented as one half of a split EP with Derby rock band You Judas, but were eventually self-released individually due to dispute between the band and their label at the time, Eyes Of Sound records. The single was produced by Ben Phillips at City Of Dis Studios in Kent (who also produced debut LP "The Sunmachine And The Ocean") and features artwork from renowned designer Seldon Hunt.

This single is currently only available via The Ocean Fracture's online store.

Both tracks on this release have received airplay from various stations including BBC Radio 1 and London's XFM, on which The Ocean Fracture were featured (and won) in a listener vote against another UK act.

Track listing 

 Cesarium (3:42)
 Black Lung Optimism (3:19)

Lineup 
Lineup on this release:
Steven Gillies (vocals, guitar)
Paul McArthur (guitar, vocals)
Sean Campbell (drums)
Martin Ritchie (bass, 2005–2008)

References 

2008 singles
Experimental rock songs
2008 songs